The spiny pocket mouse (Chaetodipus spinatus) is a species of rodent in the family Heteromyidae and order Rodentia. It is found in Baja California in Mexico and in Arizona, California and Nevada.

Description
The spiny pocket mouse has long hairs and spines on its back that are flexible. These spines differentiates C. spinatus from pocket mice in other genera. Their ears are small and round. They have long tails that are 126% of the length of their head and body. Their coat colors vary among islands but are generally brown on the tops of their bodies and tan on their sides.

Distribution and habitat
They also range from southeast California to the south by the cape of Baja California Peninsula (Mexico) where they are native. Because of its wide range in distribution and its absence in agricultural areas, the spiny pocket mouse population has little concern of extinction.

Diet
This mouse's diet varies according to the habitat it lives in. Their diet probably consists of seeds and green vegetation at times of rainfall. Since water is a rarity in its habitat, it is likely that it mainly derives its water from food.

Ecology
The spiny pocket mouse is nocturnal. This characteristic allows the spiny pocket mouse to live in rough, rocky desert landscapes by taking refuge during the hot days. They sleep, breed and keep their young in burrows. Their main predator are feral cats.

References

Further reading

Chaetodipus
Mammals of the United States
Mammals of Mexico
Mammals described in 1899
Taxonomy articles created by Polbot